Rokonicha Kuotsü (1946 – 2019) was an Indian politician from Nagaland. He was the Minister of State for Local Self Government and Wastelands in the Nagaland state government.

In 1974, 1977, 1982, 1987, 1998 and 2003 he was elected to the Ghaspani-2 constituency of the Nagaland Legislative Assembly, representing various parties.

In the 2008, he lost the seat to K. Hollohon. Rokonicha got 6661 votes (28.54%). Rokonicha contested as a Naga People's Front candidate.

References 

Indian National Congress politicians from Nagaland
Nagaland MLAs 2003–2008
Naga People's Front politicians
1946 births
Living people